Cutoff Mountain is a  mountain summit located in Park County, Montana.

Description

Cutoff Mountain is located in the Absaroka Range, which is a subset of the Rocky Mountains. It is situated in the Absaroka-Beartooth Wilderness, along the Yellowstone National Park boundary, on land managed by Gallatin National Forest. Precipitation runoff from the mountain drains into tributaries of the Lamar River, which in turn is a tributary of the Yellowstone River. This geographical feature was originally named Cutoff Peak in 1929, and the Cutoff Mountain name was officially adopted in 1969 by the United States Board on Geographic Names.

Climate

Based on the Köppen climate classification, Cutoff Mountain is located in a subarctic climate zone characterized by long, usually very cold winters, and mild summers. Winter temperatures can drop below −10 °F with wind chill factors below −30 °F.

Gallery

See also

 Geology of the Rocky Mountains
 Mountains and mountain ranges of Yellowstone National Park

References

External links

 Weather forecast: Cutoff Mountain

Mountains of Montana
Mountains of Park County, Montana
Mountains of Yellowstone National Park
North American 3000 m summits
Gallatin National Forest